The 1972 CFL Draft composed of nine rounds where 70 Canadian football players that were chosen exclusively from eligible Canadian universities. The Montreal Alouettes, who had the worst record in the Eastern Conference in the previous season, had the first overall selection.

1st round

1. Montreal Alouettes  Larry Smith  RB  Bishop's

2. Edmonton Eskimos              Mike Lambrose  LB  Queen's

3. British Columbia Lions        Steve Szapka  G  Simon Fraser

4. Hamilton Tiger-Cats  Tom Walker  FB  Waterloo Lutheran

5. Montreal Alouettes                Peter Paliotti  WR  Loyola

6. Hamilton Tiger-Cats  John Harris  T  York

7. Hamilton Tiger-Cats  Mike O'Shaughnessy  DE  McMaster

8. Toronto Argonauts             Rick Chevers  LB  Waterloo

9. Calgary Stampeders            Don Moulton  DB  Calgary

2nd round

10. Montreal Alouettes               Alexander Baptist  LB  Bishop's

11. Winnipeg Blue Bombers        Bruce Miatello  T  McMaster

12. Toronto Argonauts  Stewart Francis  LB  Simon Fraser

13. Calgary Stampeders               John Konihowski  WR  Saskatchewan

14. Calgary Stampeders               Bill Hogan  WR  Waterloo Lutheran

15. Winnipeg Blue Bombers            Jon Dellandrea  T  Toronto

16. Saskatchewan Roughriders     Bob Toogood  DE  Manitoba

17. Toronto Argonauts  Bill Turnbull  DB  Waterloo Lutheran

18. Calgary Stampeders               Bob Bayter  DB  McMaster

3rd round

19. Montreal Alouettes               Rick Kaupp  DB  New Brunswick

20. Edmonton Eskimos                 Glen Colwill  TB  Simon Fraser

21. British Columbia Lions  Bob Friend  DB  Simon Fraser

22. Ottawa Rough Riders          Doug Cihoki  E  Western Ontario

23. Winnipeg Blue Bombers            Rein Enno  C  Toronto

24. Hamilton Tiger-Cats              Jim Chalkley  FB  McMaster

25. Saskatchewan Roughriders  Joe Watt  T  McMaster

26. Toronto Argonauts                John Buda  T  Waterloo

27. Calgary Stampeders               Jeff Owen  T  Windsor

4th round

28. Montreal Alouettes               Jim Leone  G  St. Francis Xavier

29. Edmonton Eskimos                 Roy Beechey  WR  Alberta

30. British Columbia Lions           Art Lestins  T  Waterloo Lutheran

31. Ottawa Rough Riders              Stew MacSween  DB  Toronto

32. Winnipeg Blue Bombers            John Morash  DT  Windsor

33. Hamilton Tiger-Cats  Jerry Mays  WR  McMaster

34. Saskatchewan Roughriders  Jim Cooper  DB  Waterloo Lutheran

35. Toronto Argonauts                Mike Urban  QB  Windsor

36. Calgary Stampeders               Don Westlake  TB  Guelph

5th round

37. Montreal Alouettes                Mike Tanner  DB  Dalhousie

38. Edmonton Eskimos                  Barry St. George  WR  Ottawa

39. British Columbia Lions  Bill MacDonald  QB  Bishop's

40. Ottawa Rough Riders               Ron Perowne  TB  Bishop's

41. Winnipeg Blue Bombers             Jamie Horne  LB  Manitoba

42. Hamilton Tiger-Cats  Dan Smith  QB  Ottawa

43. Toronto Argonauts                 Gary Jeffries  DB  Waterloo Lutheran

44. Calgary Stampeders                Paul Knill  DB  Western Ontario

6th round

45. Montreal Alouettes                Dave Scharman  G  Waterloo Lutheran

46. Edmonton Eskimos                  Dave Syme  QB  Simon Fraser

47. British Columbia Lions            Jean Gouin  T  Ottawa

48. Ottawa Rough Riders               Gordon Ladbrook  LB  Dalhousie

49. Winnipeg Blue Bombers             Mario Nardone  DT  Carleton

50. Hamilton Tiger-Cats               Mark Drexler  DE  Western Ontario

51. Hamilton Tiger-Cats               Mark Baldosoro  HB  McMaster

52. Toronto Argonauts  Rick Henderson  G  Waterloo Lutheran

53. Calgary Stampeders                William Lockington  QB  McMaster

7th round

54. Montreal Alouettes  John Danaher  DE  New Brunswick

55. Edmonton Eskimos                  Bud Coupland  WR  Calgary

56. British Columbia Lions            Wayne Terry  DB  Ottawa

57. Ottawa Rough Riders                Fred Tokaryk  DT  Dalhousie

58. Winnipeg Blue Bombers             Mark Millen  DE  Manitoba

59. Hamilton Tiger-Cats               Rick Wiedenhoeft  DB  Waterloo

60. Toronto Argonauts  Doug Ball  HB  Toronto

61. Calgary Stampeders                Frank Belvedere  HB  Loyola

8th round

62. Montreal Alouettes                Ian Purcell  DB  Simon Fraser

63. Edmonton Eskimos  Jerry Simpson  DB  Dalhousie

64. British Columbia Lions  Ron Warner  G  British Columbia

65. Winnipeg Blue Bombers  Bill Thompson  DE  Queen's

66. Calgary Stampeders  Scott Henderson  C  Calgary

9th round

67. Montreal Alouettes                Larry Rodenbush  C  Brandon

68. Montreal Alouettes                William Beaton  G  Carleton

69. Winnipeg Blue Bombers             Doug Cozac  HB  Queen's

70. Calgary Stampeders                Rick Coleman  DT  Calgary

References
Canadian Draft

Canadian College Draft
Cfl Draft, 1972